Siiri Vilhelmiina Välimaa (born 10 April 1990) is a Finnish footballer who currently plays for TPS of the Naisten Liiga women's premier division. She has previously played for NiceFutis in the Finnish Naisten Liiga for five seasons. Välimaa was a member of Finnish squad at the 2013 Cyprus Cup and 2013 UEFA Women's Euro Championship although she has not yet capped for the Finland national team.

In November 2012 Välimaa trained for the Swedish Damallsvenskan side Djurgårdens IF. Her transfer was cancelled due to Djurgården's relegation. Välimaa signed for Kolbotn in December 2013.

References 

1990 births
Finnish women's footballers
Finnish expatriate footballers
Finnish expatriate sportspeople in Norway
Toppserien players
Expatriate women's footballers in Norway
People from Rauma, Finland
Living people
NiceFutis players
Kansallinen Liiga players
Women's association football goalkeepers
Sportspeople from Satakunta